Qarai may refer to:
 Qarai, Tehran
 Qarai, Zanjan
 Tatar, Qubadli, a village in the Qubadli Rayon of Azerbaijan
 Qarai Turks

See also
Karai (disambiguation)
Karay (disambiguation)